Delta Kappa Fraternity was a national fraternity in the United States of America that existed from 1920 to 1964.  Local chapters still exist in New York state.

History

Founding and early growth
The fraternity was founded as Kappa Kappa Kappa at the State Normal School in Buffalo, New York (now Buffalo State College) by James Finley, Albert Meinhold, Albert Stalk, Fred Weyler, and Arthur S. Bellfield as a fraternity for students majoring in education. The organization was first incorporated in New York in 1930.  It was a national fraternity for the teaching profession with its headquarters in Buffalo, NY. It assumed the name Kappa Kappa Kappa (ΚΚΚ) to represent the tri-Kappa symbolism of Korufaios , Kathapos , and Kosmos . The fraternity voted to change its name to Delta Kappa at the 1936 convention to avoid being confused with the Ku Klux Klan and was incorporated for a second time under the new name in 1937. At the 1936 convention, the fraternity also changed the scope of the organization by changing its emphasis from professional to social and allowing any bachelor's degree granting institution to host a chapter.

The fraternity went inactive from 1944 to 1946 during World War II.  Delta Kappa quickly reactivated seven chapters by the end of 1948. The organization then began expanding outside of the state of New York by adding chapters in six other states.  This growth was hastened when the fraternity decided to drop the requirement that at least half the members of any petitioning fraternal group be working toward a degree in the teaching profession.

Loss of chapters
Delta Kappa was growing until a 1953 edict by the SUNY Board of Trustees forced the abandonment of all chapters affiliated with national societies in state supported schools. Delta Kappa, along with several other Greek Letter Organizations, fought this edict in court under the case name Webb vs. State University of New York where they argued for the benefits of national affiliation and showed the lack of discriminatory clauses in their constitutions.  Unfortunately for Delta Kappa the courts sided with the SUNY Board of Trustees in 1954 by ruling that the trustees were acting in their supervisory powers.

The decision cost the fraternity eight chapters in New York State.  In a later petition, the fraternity claimed that the edict also caused the closing of two other chapters (ΔΡ and ΗΦ).  Most of the New York chapters became local fraternities after the ruling.  The loss of chapters and know-how threw the Delta Kappa national leadership into a tailspin and Delta Chi and Kappa chapters, perhaps thinking there was no more national fraternity, affiliated with other organizations.

Independent New York chapters
With the loss of the court case the chapters at SUNY institutions became independent local fraternities after 1953.  The chapter at Ithaca would follow suit in 1964.

Reorganization in Wisconsin
Within the space of a year, Delta Kappa went from having nineteen chapters down to seven.  With most of the active chapters now in Wisconsin a meeting was called in 1954 where it was decided that there should be an attempt to save the fraternity. In 1956 the fraternity was incorporated for the third time in the state of Wisconsin and the national offices were moved to Milwaukee.

The move to Wisconsin did not help with the fraternity's growth.  Delta Kappa did add two new chapters between 1954 and 1963 but three chapters, Phi, Chi Delta, and Sigma Phi, disaffiliated to join other organizations.  By 1963 there were only six chapters left in the fraternity.

Merger
In an attempt to save the remaining chapters and preserve some unity the fraternity began looking at other organizations for a merger.  Fraternities with active chapters at the six schools where Delta Kappa was active were not considered.  Of the remaining organizations Sigma Pi was chosen since it was considered best at fulfilling the goals of their young men.

In late 1964, Delta Kappa merged with Sigma Pi Fraternity, with the approval of the conventions occurring in June and September, respectively. Of the six chapters, four (Wisconsin-Milwaukee, Wisconsin-Stout, Milton, and Western State College of Colorado) became Sigma Pi chapters. The chapter at Wisconsin-Oshkosh decided to go its own way and affiliate with Delta Sigma Phi Fraternity. The chapter at Ithaca College (which is not a SUNY institution) became a local fraternity.

With the merger, Sigma Pi gave the joining Delta Kappa chapters designations starting with Delta to help maintain their sense of history.  This was out of order since new chapters were then being named in the Gamma series.  Sigma Pi has never named any chapter Delta Kappa as a sign of respect to their new brothers.  Sigma Pi also initiated any Delta Kappa alumni who wished to attend their initiation ceremonies.

After the Merger
Sigma Pi made an effort to reach out to Delta Kappa alumni in Wisconsin by colonizing at schools that once had DK chapters or where alumni were nearby.  Between 1966 and 1971 five chapters were chartered in the state, at Wisconsin-Stevens Point, Wisconsin-Oshkosh, Wisconsin-Whitewater, Wisconsin-Platteville, and Wisconsin-LaCrosse.  When the SUNY ban on national fraternities was lifted in 1976 Sigma Pi contacted the surviving chapters of Delta Kappa in New York state but there was little interest in joining a national organization again.

At least one national officer of Delta Kappa, Richard Barnard (Milton College), became a national officer in Sigma Pi.  Barnard served on the Sigma Pi Grand Council as Grand Secretary from 1970 to 1974. He also served on the Sigma Pi Educational Foundation as Treasurer from 1990 to 1994 and as President from 1994 to 1996.

Publications

The Delta Kappa Pledge Manual was last published in 1959.
The Kappan was a yearbook that was published every year.
The Deltan was a newsletter that was published at the discretion of the national officers starting in 1958.
The Operational Handbook was an aid for chapter officers.

Membership
Membership in Delta Kappa, like most fraternities, was limited to males.  The 1959 Pledge Manual stated that "membership is open to any male who believes in a supreme being."  According to the 1963 edition of Baird's Manual (the last published before the merger with Sigma Pi) there were no membership restrictions.  Baird's also stated that the organization had 1,200 members in 1963.

Governance

Grand Chapter
The Grand Chapter of Delta Kappa met in the spring during the National Convention and was composed of the Board of Directors and delegates from each chapter and alumni club.  The Board of Directors was composed of six national officers:  President, Vice President, Corresponding Secretary, Recording Secretary, Treasurer, and Librarian.  Each chapter could send two voting delegates to the Grand Chapter while alumni clubs received one voting delegate.  A two-thirds vote was needed for the grand chapter to pass by-laws or to suspend chapters.  The National Convention was held each year with a different chapter hosting each convention and arranging the accommodations.

Two awards were given during the National Convention.  A Scholarship Award was given to the chapter with the highest Grade Point Average.  A Distance Travelled Award was given to the chapter that travelled the farthest to attend.

A Fall Business Meeting could also be called at the discretion of the National President.  Attendance was not compulsory.

Board of directors
The Board of Directors governed the fraternity when the Grand Chapter was not in session.  Board members were elected to one year terms at each meeting of the Grand Chapter.  The President was the executive of the fraternity while the Vice President oversaw the ritual and was director of expansion.  The Corresponding Secretary kept meeting minutes and oversaw correspondence while the Recording Secretary kept membership records.  The Treasurer kept the fraternity's finances and the Librarian acted as the historian and publisher of the Kappan.

Each chapter was inspected yearly by at least one member of the Board of Directors during a Chapter Visitation.

NIC

The 1963 edition of Baird's Manual lists Delta Kappa in its National Interfraternity Conference non-member section.  Between 1954 and 1964 the fraternity lost three chapters to NIC member fraternities.  This did not violate the NIC anti-pirating rule since it only applies to member fraternity chapters.

Expansion Plan

Delta Kappa's expansion plan called for contacting local fraternities with at least ten members at accredited four year colleges.  Petitioning groups paid installation fees but had their first year chapter dues waived.

Notable alumni
This section includes alumni of the local Delta Kappa chapters in New York.

List of chapters

Undergraduate chapters
Known undergraduate chapters were

Alumni Chapters
Alumni Chapters were usually given the name of the local college chapter with the Greek letter Pi added before the local chapter name.  Alumni chapters could be recognized if they had five or more men who had graduated or left school in good standing.  Known alumni chapters are:
 Pi Alpha - Buffalo, NY
 Pi Beta - Cortland, NY
 Pi Kappa – Evansville, IN
 Pi Chi Delta – Whitewater, WI
 Pi Omicron – Milwaukee, WI
 Pi Sigma Phi – Frostburg, MD
 Pi Chi Gamma – Milton, WI
 Pi Epsilon – Ithaca, NY
 Pi Phi – Clarion, PA

Fraternity song
Hail Men of Delta Kappa 
  Words by Bill Fyfe, Music by Sam Forcucci 

Hail Men of Delta Kappa
  Keep your honor ever high.
Raise your heads fling out your banner
  Let the colors never die.

We are brothers all DK men,
  With a trust that men hold high.
It's a pledge we call good fellowship,
  Let our emblem fill the sky.

Sing out with voice proclaiming,
  Let our song be ever known.
We are proud to be DK men,
  With an emblem all our own.

We are brothers pledged together
  That our faith be ever true.
In the pledge we call good fellowship,
  Men of DK here's to you.

References

External links
Delta Kappa Fraternity of Ithaca College
Delta Kappa Kappa Fraternity of SUNY Oswego

Student societies in the United States
Defunct fraternities and sororities
Student organizations established in 1920
1920 establishments in New York (state)
Sigma Pi